Studence is a settlement in the Municipality of Žalec in east-central Slovenia. It lies in the hills north of Žalec. The area is part of the traditional region of Styria. The municipality is now included in the Savinja Statistical Region.

Finds from Bezgec Cave near the settlement show evidence of Eneolithic settlement.

References

External links
Studence at Geopedia

Populated places in the Municipality of Žalec